The Anfa Expedition of 1468 took place when a Portuguese fleet commanded by Duke Fernando of Viseu razed the town of Anfa, then one of the most important cities in Morocco and a renown pirate haven.

History

Anfa was among the most prosperous cities in Morocco, and owed its wealth to both the export of foodstuffs such as wheat grown in the highly fertile sorrounding regions, and the fact that it was a notorious pirate haven. It imported fine silk clothes, gold and silver currency from Granada, and featured a high number of merchants and noble residences. According to Leo Africanus, ships departed from its harbour to raid the coasts of the Iberian peninsula.

Wishing to distinguish himself through a feat of arms, Duke Ferdinand of Beja and of Viseu, heir of Prince Henry the Navigator, Duke of Beja and of Viseu and governor of both the Order of Santiago and Order of Christ, accepted to fulfill the desire of King Afonso V to destroy the city and neutralize the threat it posed. Duke Ferdinand was experienced in the African theater, and had already previously distinguished himself fighting at Alcácer Ceguer and Tangier.

Before attacking the city, Duke Fernando dispatched a fidalgo of his houselhold, knight of Santiago and alcaide-mor of Sines Estevão da Gama (father of Vasco da Gama) to spy the city disguised as a fig merchant. Gama duly fulfilled his mission, observing the defenses of the city as he sold a cargo of figs from Algarve across the city. The exact numbers involved in the expedition are not known but may have involved as many as 10 000 men and about 50 ships.

As the Portuguese fleet approached the city, the inhabitants evacuated it and fled to Rabat and Salé. The city was then sacked and almost completely demolished by the Portuguese army, some sources stating the Portuguese encountered little resistance, others none at all. In the words of Leo Africanus:

Anfa remained abandoned for three centuries. The region of Anfa would again be attacked by the Portuguese in 1487.

See also
Portuguese conquest of Ceuta
Conquest of Asilah
Portuguese Asilah
Portuguese Tangier

References

Conflicts in 1468
Battles involving the Wattasid dynasty
Battles involving Portugal
15th century in Morocco
Morocco–Portugal military relations